Zurab Pataradze (born 12 February 1973) is a Georgian diplomat and government official who was Chairman of the Government of the Autonomous Republic of Adjara between 15 July 2016 and 21 July 2018.

Education and diplomatic career 
Born in Batumi, Pataradze graduated from the Tbilisi State University with a degree in economics in 1994 and the Batumi State University with a degree in law in 2007. After working for a Batumi-based bank office in the mid-1990s, Pataradze joined the state service in 1996, first at an anti-organized crime unit of the Ministry of Internal Affairs of Adjara and then the Ministry of Foreign Affairs of Georgia in 2000. In 2004 Pataradze became a second secretary at the Georgian embassy to Russia in charge of consular service; after Georgia and Russia cut direct diplomatic relations in 2008, Pataradze served as a consular officer at the Georgian interests section at the Swiss embassy in Moscow until 2009. Pataradze was then Georgia's consul general in the northern Greek city of Thessaloniki from 2009 to 2010, consul general to Istanbul from 2011 to 2012, ambassador to Turkey from 2012 to 2013, and ambassador to Kazakhstan from 2013 to 2016.

Government of Adjara 
In July 2016, Zurab Pataradze was nominated by President of Georgia Giorgi Margvelashvili as the head of the government of Adjara, an autonomous region on the Black Sea coast, after the incumbent Archil Khabadze announced his resignation just three months before the scheduled elections. Pataridze narrowly won a confidence vote in the region's legislature on 15 July 2016. He resigned on 4 July 2018 and was replaced by Tornike Rizhvadze on 21 July.

References

Heads of Government of Adjara
1973 births
Living people
Diplomats of Georgia (country)
People from Batumi
21st-century politicians from Georgia (country)
Heads of government of the Georgian Soviet Socialist Republic